The men's Greco-Roman 80 kilograms is a competition featured at the 2016 World Wrestling Championships, and was held in Budapest, Hungary on 11 December.

Results
Legend
F — Won by fall

Final

Top half

Bottom half

Repechage

References
Results Book, Page 31

Men's Greco-Roman 80 kg